Luckas Benjhamín Carreño Oñate (born 4 July 2003) is a Chilean professional footballer who plays as a midfielder for Chilean Primera División side Deportes La Serena.

Club career
As a child, Carreño was with Palestino, Colo-Colo and Magallanes in Chile and with Oriente Petrolero in Bolivia, then he joined Deportes La Serena in 2019. He made his professional debut in a 2021 Copa Chile match against Deportes Colina on June 23, 2021, and scored his first goal in the match against Huachipato on March 20, 2022.

International career
Since 2021, Carreño has been frequently called up for Chile at under-20 level and took part in the tournament Copa Rául Coloma Rivas, playing a match against Paraguay U20. Also, he played in a friendly match against the same opponent in 2022. Next he made appearances in two friendly matches against Peru U20 in July 2022. In September 2022, he made an appearance in the Costa Cálida Supercup.

Personal life
He is the son of Ángel Carreño, a former professional footballer who played for Colo-Colo and Deportes La Serena, among others clubs. As a curiosity, Luckas scored by first time against the same opponent in the same goal than his father.

References

External links
 
 
 Luckas Carreño at playmakerstats.com (English version of ceroacero.es)

2003 births
Living people
Footballers from Santiago
Chilean footballers
Chilean expatriate footballers
Chile under-20 international footballers
Association football midfielders
Deportes La Serena footballers
Chilean Primera División players
Expatriate footballers in Bolivia
Chilean expatriate sportspeople in Bolivia